The title of protosebastos (prōtosébastos, "first sebastos") was a high Byzantine court title created by Emperor Alexios I Komnenos.

History
Although the title first appears in a document of 1049, where Domenico I Contarini, the Doge of Venice, uses it alongside the title of patrikios to refer to himself, it is commonly accepted that it was created by Emperor Alexios I Komnenos. It was first conferred to his brother Adrianos, while another early holder, his brother-in-law Michael Taronites, was soon after raised to the even higher title of panhypersebastos. It was also conferred on Sergius VI of Naples and his son, John VI, at about the same time. 

Later, during the 12th century, it was given to close relatives of the Byzantine emperor, such as the eldest son of a sebastokratōr. In the Palaiologan period it was conferred to leading aristocratic families, such as the Tarchaneiotai, the Raoul, etc.

The Book on Offices by Pseudo-Kodinos, written shortly after the middle of the 14th century, places the prōtosebastos in the thirteenth place in the overall hierarchy after the emperor, between the megas logothetēs and the pinkernēs. His ceremonial costume comprised a golden-green skiadion hat with silk embroideries, or a domed skaranikon in a reddish apricot colour decorated with gold-wire embroidery, with a painted glass depiction of the emperor standing in front, and enthroned in the rear. A rich silk kabbadion tunic was also worn.

Notable holders
 Adrianos Komnenos, brother of Alexios I Komnenos
 Alexios Branas, general
 Alexios Komnenos, nephew of Manuel I Komnenos, de facto regent in 1180–82
 Constantine Bodin, ruler of Duklja in 1081–1101
 George Mouzalon, friend and chief minister of Theodore II Laskaris
 Hrelja, magnate of the Serbian Empire
 John Komnenos, nephew of Alexios I Komnenos and governor of Dyrrhachium
 Michael Panaretos, official and historian of the Empire of Trebizond
 Philaretos Brachamios, general
Theodore Branas, general and husband of the twice empress Agnes of France

References

Sources

 
 
 
 
 

Byzantine court titles